Doliops imitator is a species of beetle in the family Cerambycidae. It was described by Schultze in 1918.

References

Doliops
Beetles described in 1918